Anabarilius liui is a species of ray-finned fish in the genus Anabarilius. The nominate subspecies lui is endemic to the upper Yangtze basin in China, but there are no recent records and it is considered extinct in the 2009 Chinese red list.

References

Anabarilius
Fish described in 1944